Cape Freeman is a cape marking the east end of the peninsula separating Seligman Inlet and Trail Inlet, on the east coast of Graham Land, Antarctica. The cape was photographed from the air in 1940 by the U.S. Antarctic Service. It was charted in 1947 by the Falklands Islands Dependencies Survey (FIDS), who named it for R.L. Freeman, a FIDS surveyor at the Stonington Island base.

References

Headlands of Graham Land